George Catlin Woodruff (December 1, 1805 – November 21, 1885) was a Democratic member of the United States House of Representatives from Connecticut's 4th congressional district from 1861 to 1863. He also served as member of the Connecticut House of Representatives in 1851, 1866, and 1874. He served terms as court clerk, justice of the peace, grand juror, probate judge, postmaster, town treasurer, town clerk, president and director of a bank, and colonel in the militia.

Early life 
Woodruff was born in Litchfield, Connecticut. He was the son of Major General Morris Woodruff and Candace Catlin. Woodruff was graduated from Yale College in 1825. He studied law at the Litchfield Law School. He was admitted to the bar in 1827 and began practice in Litchfield.

Public service 
He was Postmaster of Litchfield from January 4, 1832, to January 27, 1842, and from September 2, 1842, to September 28, 1846. He served as member of the Connecticut House of Representatives in 1851, 1866, and 1874. Woodruff was elected to the Thirty-seventh Congress (March 4, 1861 – March 3, 1863). He was an unsuccessful candidate for reelection in 1862 to the Thirty-eighth Congress. He continued the practice of law until his death in Litchfield, Connecticut, November 21, 1885. He was interred in East Cemetery.

External links 

 
 Litchfield Ledger

References

1805 births
1885 deaths
Connecticut lawyers
Democratic Party members of the Connecticut House of Representatives
Politicians from Litchfield, Connecticut
Yale College alumni
Democratic Party members of the United States House of Representatives from Connecticut
Litchfield Law School alumni
19th-century American politicians
19th-century American lawyers